Nater may refer to:

People
Hamid Nater (born 1980), Moroccan footballer
Marc-Sven Nater (born 1965), Swiss rower
Stéphane Nater (born 1984), Swiss footballer
Swen Nater (born 1950), Dutch basketball player

Places
Nater, Iran, Iranian village

See also
Nader, given name and surname
Naters, Swiss municipality
Naters, Netherlands, Dutch municipality